The 2015 Nigerian House of Representatives elections in Bayelsa State was held on March 28, 2015, to elect members of the House of Representatives to represent Bayelsa State, Nigeria.

Overview

Summary

Results

Brass/Nembe 
PDP candidate Jephthah Foingha won the election, defeating other party candidates.

Ogbia 
PDP candidate  Sodaguno Festus Omoni won the election, defeating other party candidates.

Sagbama/Ekeremor  
PDP candidate Fred Agbedi won the election, defeating other party candidates.

Southern Ijaw 
PDP candidate Henry Aladeinyefa Daniel-Ofongo won the election, defeating other party candidates.

Yenagoa/Kolokuna/Opokuma  
PDP candidate Douye Diri won the election, defeating other party candidates.

References 

Bayelsa State House of Representatives elections
House of Representatives
Bayelsa State